The city of Syracuse, on the island of Sicily southwest of the Italian peninsula, has been besieged repeatedly since its founding as a Greek colony, including the following:

 Before the Common Era, while a Greek colony or Hellenistic state:
 415–413 by the Athenians during the Sicilian Expedition
 397 by the Carthaginians
 343 by Hicetas, the Carthaginians and Timoleon
 311–09 by the Carthaginians
 278 by the Carthaginians
 214–2 by the Roman Republic during the Second Punic War (and subject of film L'Assedio di Siracusa)
 In the Common Era, while a Byzantine province, by the Aghlabids:
 827–8 
 868 
 877–8